Eloeophila maculata is a species of fly in the family Limoniidae.
It is a Palearctic species with a limited distribution in Europe   

It is found in a wide range of habitats and micro habitats: in earth rich in humus, in swamps and marshes, in leaf litter and in wet spots in woods.

References

Limoniidae
Insects described in 1804